Ivan Medvid (born 13 October 1977) is a Bosnian retired footballer who played as a defender.

Club career
Medvid previously played for NK Slaven Belupo in the Croatian Prva HNL, as well as for NK Posušje, South Korean club Pohang Steelers, NK Široki Brijeg, Šibenik, Dugopolje, Junak Sinj and Konavljanin.

International career
He made his debut for Bosnia and Herzegovina in a February 2001 friendly match against Hungary and has earned a total of 5 caps, scoring no goals. His final international was a February 2005 friendly against Iran.

Honours

Player
Posušje
First League of Herzeg-Bosnia: 1999, 2000
Široki Brijeg
Bosnian Premier League: 2003–04, 2005–06
Dugopolje
Croatian Second Football League: 2011–12

References

External links
 
 
 

1977 births
Living people
Footballers from Split, Croatia
Association football defenders
Croatian footballers
Croatia under-21 international footballers
Bosnia and Herzegovina footballers
Bosnia and Herzegovina international footballers
HŠK Posušje players
NK Slaven Belupo players
Pohang Steelers players
NK Široki Brijeg players
HNK Cibalia players
HNK Šibenik players
NK Dugopolje players
NK Junak Sinj players
Premier League of Bosnia and Herzegovina players
Croatian Football League players
K League 1 players
First Football League (Croatia) players
Second Football League (Croatia) players
Bosnia and Herzegovina expatriate footballers
Expatriate footballers in Croatia
Bosnia and Herzegovina expatriate sportspeople in Croatia
Expatriate footballers in South Korea
Bosnia and Herzegovina expatriate sportspeople in South Korea
Croatian expatriate sportspeople in South Korea